"Walking Back to Me" is a song by the English female singer-songwriter Sam Brown, written by Brown, and Gregg Sutton. It appears on her debut album Stop!.

Track listings

CD single – DE
"Walking Back to Me"
"Living In Your Own World"
"Tender Hearts"
"Leave It Be"

7" single – UK
"Walking Back to Me"
"Tender Hearts"

12" single – UK
Side A
"Walking Back to Me"
"Living In Your Own World"

Side B
"Tender Hearts"
"Leave It Be"

Personnel
Credits are adapted from the album's liner notes.
Sam Brown – lead vocals; piano 
Pete Brown – lesley guitar; backing vocals
Paul Bangash – guitar
Richard Newman – drums
Jim Leverton – bass guitar
Danny Schogger – keyboards
Phil Saatchi – backing vocals

Charts and sales

Peak positions

References

1988 singles
1980s ballads
Sam Brown (singer) songs
1988 songs
A&M Records singles
Songs written by Gregg Sutton
Songs written by Sam Brown (singer)